Game is Flow's second studio album. The single has two editions: regular and limited. The limited edition includes a bonus DVD. It reached #4 on the Oricon charts  and charted for 17 weeks.

Track listing

References

2004 albums
Flow (band) albums